"Boom Selection" is a song by UK garage crew Genius Cru. The single reached No. 12 on the UK Singles Chart and No. 1 on the UK Dance Singles Chart in January 2001. The song samples "Gravedigger" by the New York Rock & Roll Ensemble, to which Martin Fulterman and Michael Kamen are credited as songwriters.

Capital Xtra included the song in their list of "The Best Old-School Garage Anthems of All Time".

Track listing
UK 12" single
A1. "Boom Selection" (Original Vocal Mix) – 4:50
A2. "Bulletproof Dub" – 4:55
AA1. "Boom Selection" (Gridlock Remix) – 7:11

UK CD single
 "Boom Selection" (Original Vocal Mix) – 4:50
 "Bulletproof Dub" – 4:55
 "Boom Selection" (Gridlock Remix) – 7:11
 Boom Selection Video

Charts

References

2000 songs
2001 singles
UK garage songs
Songs written by Michael Kamen